Chosha Bay (Choshskaya Guba) is an inlet of the Barents Sea, 84 miles (135 km) wide and 62 miles (100 km) long, lies between the East shore of Kanin peninsula and the mainland of northern European Russia.

Bays of the Barents Sea
Bays of Russia
Bodies of water of Nenets Autonomous Okrug